Ganthiya are deep fried Indian snacks made from chickpea flour. Along with Khakhra, Fafda, Dhokla, and Khandvi (among others), they are among the most popular snacks originating from the Indian State of Gujarat. They are a popular teatime snack not only in Gujarat but across India and also among NRIs across the world. They are sometimes soft and not always crunchy like most other Indian snacks. A sweeter version is called Mitha Ganthiya. Bhavnagar city of Gujarat is famous for its variety of Ganthiya.

References

Indian snack foods
Chickpea dishes